The Abbeys Amble is a long-distance path in North Yorkshire, England.  It is a circular walk of 104 miles (167 km), based on Ripon. It links three abbeys -  Fountains Abbey, Bolton Abbey and Jervaulx Abbey - and three castles - Ripley Castle, Bolton Castle and Middleham Castle.

References

Further reading

External links
 Long Distance Walkers' Association

Footpaths in North Yorkshire
Long-distance footpaths in England